The August 23 Artillery Battle Museum is a museum in Zhongzheng Park, Jinhu Township, Kinmen, Taiwan.

History
The museum was built in 1988 to commemorate the 30th anniversary of the 23 August 1958 Artillery War during the Second Taiwan Strait Crisis.

Architecture
On both sides of the museum main entrance are carved the names of the 587 ROC armed forces servicemen who lost their lives in the bombardment. On the left side are displayed the main air fighter used by the forces at that time and the main artillery piece. On the right side is one of the amphibious landing craft which played a vital role in transporting troops and materials during the battle. The museum building is surrounded by banyan trees.

Exhibitions
The museum exhibits historical artifacts in 12 display areas for charts, photographs, documents, relics and models.

See also
 List of museums in Taiwan

References

1988 establishments in Taiwan
Jinhu Township
Military and war museums in Taiwan
Museums established in 1988
Museums in Kinmen County